Acronia strasseni is a species of beetle in the family Cerambycidae. It was described by Bernhard Schwarzer in 1931. It is known from the Philippines.

References

Acronia
Beetles described in 1931